David Kirui (born 15 December 1974) is a Kenyan sprinter. He competed in the men's 400 metres at the 2000 Summer Olympics.

References

1974 births
Living people
Athletes (track and field) at the 2000 Summer Olympics
Kenyan male sprinters
Olympic athletes of Kenya
Place of birth missing (living people)